Osmania Medical College, formerly known as The Hyderabad Medical School, is a medical college in Hyderabad, Telangana, India. It was founded in 1846 by the 5th Nizam of Hyderabad and Berar, Afzal ud Dowla, Asaf Jah 5. The college was originally affiliated to Osmania University system, It is now affiliated to the Kaloji Narayana Rao University of Health Sciences, and the Osmania General Hospital. After the establishment of the Osmania University in 1919, the school was renamed Osmania Medical College, after the seventh Nizam of Hyderabad, Mir Osman Ali Khan.

Affiliated Specialty Training Hospitals
Osmania General Hospital, Afzalgunj
Niloufer Hospital 
Sir Ronald Ross Institute of Tropical and Communicable Diseases 
Sarojini Devi Eye Hospital
Government ENT Hospital 
Institute of Mental Health, Erragadda
Government Chest Hospital(TB), Erragadda
Government Maternity Hospital, Sultan Bazar
Modern Government Maternity Hospital (MGMH), Petlaburj
MNJ Institute of Oncology Regional Cancer Hospital, Lakdikapul

History 
The college was established in 1846 and named the Hyderabad Medical School, during the reign of the 5th Nizam of Hyderabad - Afzal ad-Dawlah, Asaf Jah V. When the Nizam became ill, probably from diabetes, the then British resident suggested he be treated with Western medicine by Surgeon, Dr William Campbell Maclean. The Nizam recovered fully. Impressed with allopathic medicine, he ordered the establishment of the Hyderabad Medical School (which later became Osmania Medical College) in 1847, headed by Dr. Maclean.

Dr. Edward Lawrie, then principal of Hyderabad Medical School performed a series of experiments at the Afzal Gunj Hospital (now Osmania General Hospital) on anesthesia (Hyderabad Chloroform Commission). The world's first female anesthesiologist Dr. Rupa Bai Furdoonji  graduated from here in 1889.

Ranking 

Osmania Medical College ranked 20th by India Today in 2020.

Conferences 
OSMECON is the chief Medical Conference (UG) hosted by OMC and its associated hospitals. It is a 3-day event that sees participation of nearly 2,000 delegates across 17 states of the country as well as from 5 other countries, yet expanding its outreach.

Notable alumni
Dr. Rupa Bai Furdoonji, anesthesiologist
Undurti Narasimha Das, immunologist, Shanti Swarup Bhatnagar laureate
Manjula Anagani, gynecologist
 Boora Narsaiah Goud, Member of Parliament
 Chelikani Venkata Rama Rao, communist leader and parliamentarian
 P. Shankar Rao, former MLA
 J. Geeta Reddy, MLA
 K. Srinath Reddy, president of the Public Health Foundation of India
 Mandadi Prabhakar Reddy, Telugu character actor
 Nagam Janardhan Reddy, former MLA, Nagar Kurnool
 Tejaswini Manogna, Model (Miss Earth India 2019)
 Satish SC Rao, Gastroenterologist, Distinguished University Chair in Gastroenterology, Medical College Georgia, USA
 Ashok Kondur, Interventional Cardiologist, Michigan, USA; Program Director Garden City Hospital
 Dr. Chandra Pemmasani, Founder and CEO of UWorld (USMLEWorld LLC)

See also
:Category:Establishments in Hyderabad State
Osmania University
Osmania General Hospital
Niloufer Hospital
Government ENT Hospital
Sarojini Devi Eye Hospital
Fever Hospital

References

External links 

 

Educational institutions established in 1846
Medical colleges in Telangana
Regional Cancer Centres in India
Universities and colleges in Hyderabad, India
Education in the princely states of India
1846 establishments in India
Research institutes in Hyderabad, India
Establishments in Hyderabad State
Hospitals established in Hyderabad State